The VR Class Tr1 is a class of heavy freight locomotive built in Finland and Germany. Before 1942 VR Class Tr1s originally had the class name  R1. They were nicknamed “Risto”,
after the Finnish President Risto Ryti. They were numbered 1030–1096.

67 locomotives were built between 1940–57 by Tampella, Lokomo and Arnold Jung Lokomotivfabrik GmbH, Jungenthal of Germany. The "Risto" is a product of the same era as the express train locomotive Ukko-Pekka (Hr1), and they share a similar appearance as well as several common components. Because of their high tractive effort the Tr1 locomotives were also called upon for passenger service of a heavy intermediate character. Tr1 1096 was the last steam locomotive manufactured for VR in 1957. Tr1 locomotives were withdrawn during the 1970s, with the last being withdrawn in 1975.

Two Tr1 locomotives are located in the United Kingdom. One is owned by millionaire railway enthusiast David Buck, while another lies abandoned in a secluded forest in Acton, Suffolk.

See also 

 Finnish Railway Museum
 History of rail transport in Finland
 Jokioinen Museum Railway
 List of Finnish locomotives
 VR Class Pr1
 VR Class Hr1
 VR Class Tk3
 VR Group

References

 
 Finnish Railway Museum Official website
  Finnish website with locomotive technical data

Footnotes

Tr1
Tr1
Railway locomotives introduced in 1940
2-8-2 locomotives
5 ft gauge locomotives